D112 is a state road on the island of Šolta in Croatia connecting ferry port of Rogač, from where Jadrolinija ferries fly to the mainland, docking in Split and the D410 state road to the D111 state road, the main road on the island.

The road, as well as all other state roads in Croatia, is managed and maintained by Hrvatske ceste, a state-owned company.

Traffic volume 

Traffic volume is not counted directly at the D112 road, however Hrvatske ceste (HC), operator of the road reports number of vehicles using Split – Rogač ferry line, connecting the D112 road to the D410 state road. Substantial variations between annual (AADT) and summer (ASDT) traffic volumes are attributed to the fact that the road connects a number of island resorts to the mainland.

Road junctions and populated areas

See also
 Hrvatske ceste
 Jadrolinija

Sources

State roads in Croatia
Transport in Split-Dalmatia County